Pamela Colleen Springsteen (born February 8, 1962) is an American actress and photographer.  She had a short acting career, and is best known for playing the role of serial killer Angela Baker in the cult slasher/comedy/horror films Sleepaway Camp II: Unhappy Campers (1988), and Sleepaway Camp III: Teenage Wasteland (1989). She had two co-starring roles in the obscure comedies Dixie Lanes (1988), The Gumshoe Kid (1990), and smaller roles in mainstream films like Fast Times at Ridgemont High (1982), Reckless (1984) and Modern Girls (1986). She is a still photographer in the film and music industry. She is the younger sister of Bruce Springsteen.

Early life
Pamela Springsteen was born in Freehold Township, New Jersey, to Adele Ann (née Zerilli), a legal secretary of Italian ancestry, and Douglas Frederick "Dutch" Springsteen, who was of Dutch and Irish ancestry, and worked as a bus driver. When Springsteen was 7 years old, she moved with her parents to California in 1969.  In addition to her older brother Bruce Springsteen, with whom Pamela sometimes went on tour, she has a sister, Virginia Springsteen Shave. She was raised a Catholic.

Career

Acting career
Springsteen took up acting, and was cast in her first role as a young cheerleader in  Fast Times at Ridgemont High. She also appeared as a cheerleader in the 1984 film Reckless. She appeared in Modern Girls, and Scenes from the Goldmine.  Her first main supporting role came in 1988 as Judy in the obscure comedy Dixie Lanes and had her first lead role during that same year when she played psychotic serial killer Angela Baker in the low budget cult horror Sleepaway Camp II: Unhappy Campers, a role she reprised in 1989's Sleepaway Camp III: Teenage Wasteland. The films have earned her a following among horror fans. Due to this she had a 10-minute supporting role as Mary Beth Bensen in a sex comedy by the same makers titled Fast Food. Her final film appearance to date was in 1990's The Gumshoe Kid.

Springsteen has also made guest appearances on television series' such as The Facts of Life, Cagney & Lacey, Hardcastle and McCormick, and Family Ties. She left acting in order to pursue her career as a still photographer.

Photography
Springsteen began her career as a still photographer in the film and music industry.  She photographed for a number of her brother's record singles, albums and other publicity stills, and was credited with photography on his album Lucky Town.  She also photographed a number of other album covers for other artists such as Vonda Shepard and N.W.A. She was also credited as the cinematographer on his music video "The Ghost of Tom Joad".  She did still photography work on the films Jack the Dog, Manhood and Berkeley, the television films The Price of a Broken Heart and Dancing at the Harvest Moon, and the documentary The Making of the Crying Game.  She was a photo consultant on the television film The Devil's Child.

Her style of photography has attracted many celebrities, including Courtney Thorne-Smith, Dolly Parton, Tom Hanks, Calista Flockhart, Olivia Newton-John, Jaclyn Smith and rock band Def Leppard.

Other work
Springsteen directed the music video for the song "These Words We Said", by singer Kim Richey.

Personal life
Springsteen was briefly engaged to Sean Penn, her co-star in Fast Times at Ridgemont High.

Filmography

References

External links
 Pamela Springsteen Photography

1962 births
Living people
American people of Irish descent
American people of Dutch descent
American people of Italian descent
Actresses from New Jersey
People from Freehold Township, New Jersey
American photographers
American film actresses
American television actresses
Pamela
American women photographers
20th-century American actresses
Catholics from New Jersey